Sheikh Safi al-Din Khānegāh and Shrine Ensemble is the tomb of Sheikh Safi-ad-din Ardabili located in Ardabil, Iran. In 2010, it was registered on the UNESCO World Heritage List.

History
Sheikh Safi, an eminent leader of an Islamic Sufi order established by the Safavids, was born in Ardabil where this complex is located. The Safavids valued the tomb-mosque form, and the tomb with its mausoleum and prayer hall is located at a right angle to the mosque. The buildings in the complex surround a small inner courtyard (31 by 16 meters). The complex is entered through a long garden. 

The Mausoleum of Sheikh Safi, in Ardabil, was first built by his son Sheikh Sadr al-Dīn Mūsā, after Sheikh Safi's death in 1334. It was constructed between the beginning of the 16th century and the end of the 18th century. The mausoleum, a tall, domed circular tower decorated with blue tile and  about 17 meters in height; beside it is the 17th-century Porcelain House preserving the sanctuary's ceremonial wares. Also part of the complex are many sections that have served a variety of functions over the past centuries, including a library, a mosque, a school, mausolea, a cistern, a hospital, kitchens, a bakery, and some offices. It incorporates a route to reach the shrine of the sheikh divided into seven segments, which mirror the seven stages of Sufi mysticism. Various parts of the mausoleum are separated by eight gates, which represent the eight attitudes of Sufism.

Several parts were gradually added to the main structure during the Safavid dynasty. A number of Safavid sheikhs and harems and victims of the Safavids’ battles, including the Battle of Chaldiran, have been buried at the site.

Architectural features

The present complex, called the tomb of Sheikh Safi al-Din Ardabili, includes the outside of the tomb (Ali-Ghapu area), the portal, the great courtyard, the portico, the grave of Sheikh Safi al-Din itself, the Women-only space (Andaruni, a term used in Iranian architecture), the grave of King Ismail I, Chini-house which has beautiful Stuccos and several precious wooden and silver doors, The Janatsara Mosque, Khanqah, cheraqkhaneh (house of lights), Chellehkhaneh (a praying room), the burial ground of the martyrs and other belongings.

The building of the main entrance and the enclosure of 3 Domes which are decorated with mosaic tiles and epigraphs in Reqa and Kufic calligraphic form, covers this place with glory and grandeur.

The tomb of Sheikh Safi al-Din Ardabili is a cylindrical tower topped off with a short dome. Beneath the dome, there is a vault that is one of the valuable works of the tomb, and around the edge of it, there is an inscription carved in the Reqa style calligraphy.
One of the unique features of the tomb of Sheikh Safi al-Din Ardabili is that it contains several valuable works of art on different themes of art, including the perfect type of mosaic tiles, vaulted tiling with painting, Stuccos, beautiful precious inscriptions, and the wonderful calligraphy of the greatest calligraphers of Safavid era (Mir Emad Hassani, Mir Qavamoddin, Mohammad Ismail, etc.), precious wood-carvings, silversmithing, illuminated manuscripts and goldsmithing, paintings, using a different style of stonework, etc.

Gallery

References

http://www.irantourismcenter.com/?page_id=7130

Further reading

External links

Sheikh Safi al-Din Ardabili's Mausoleum Virtual Tour
More Pictures, Tishineh

Buildings and structures completed in the 18th century
Architecture in Iran
Tourist attractions in Ardabil Province
World Heritage Sites in Iran
Mausoleums in Iran
Buildings and structures in Ardabil
Safaviyeh order
Safavid dynasty